Cansu Dere (born 14 October 1980, Ankara) is a Turkish actress, model and former Miss Turkey.

Biography

Her mother partly descends from the Turkish community in Thessaloniki, Greece, while her father descends from the Turkish community in Bulgaria.

She completed her primary and secondary education in İzmir. In 2000, she was due to represent Turkey in the Miss Universe pageant but, Cansu withdrew due to political issues between Turkey and Cyprus (Host country of the Miss Universe in 2000); Turkey had no relations with the Republic of Cyprus. She was forbidden by the Turkish Government to travel to the 2000 Miss Universe pageant in Cyprus unless she could pass through Northern Cyprus, which was then forbidden for any visitor to the Republic of Cyprus. The competition committee in Turkey made arrangements for her to travel through Athens, but the day before her departure the government refused to let her go, "for political reasons". This was the second delegate that was not allowed to represent Turkey that year.

Shortly thereafter, the former Miss Turkey started to work as a professional model. She left the Archeology Department of Istanbul University and focused on the modeling profession. Representing Turkey in all international organizations of Istanbul Textile and Apparel Exporters' Association, Cansu Dere participated in various fashion shows in Paris in 2002 and 2003 and worked with many important photographers.

In 2006-2008, she played the character of 'Sıla' in the TV series Sıla with Mehmet Akif Alakurt. In 2007, she portrayed the character of 'Defne' with Kenan İmirzalıoğlu in the movie The Last Ottoman. In 2009, she took a role in the black comedy Acı Aşk. In 2009-2011, she played the character of 'Eyşan' in the Ezel series. She played the Iranian Safavid spy 'Firuze/Huymerya' character in the Magnificent Century in 2012-2013. She played the character of 'Zeynep Güneş' in the TV series Anne with Beren Gökyıldız, who played her daughter Turna/Melek in 2016-2017.  From 2020-2022, Cansu played the character of 'Asya Yılmaz' in the TV series Sadakatsiz, the Turkish adaptation of the English-made Doctor Foster series broadcast on Kanal D, in which she shared the lead role with Caner Cindoruk and Melis Sezen.

Filmography

References

External links

21st-century Turkish actresses
Living people
1980 births
Turkish female models
Turkish beauty pageant winners
Actresses from Ankara
Istanbul University alumni
Turkish film actresses
Turkish television actresses